Collège Mathieu is a small French language college based in Gravelbourg, Saskatchewan, Canada that provides post-secondary education.

History
The college was founded by Olivier Elzéar Mathieu, Archbishop of Regina, on December 15, 1917, with the first classes being offered in 1918.

See also
List of historic places in Saskatchewan

References

External links

College Mathieu Pavillion

Colleges in Saskatchewan
French-language universities and colleges in Canada outside Quebec
Educational institutions established in 1917
Catholic universities and colleges in Canada
1917 establishments in Saskatchewan